Árraga is a municipality and village in Santiago del Estero in Argentina. It is the head district of the Silípica Department to the southwest of the province of Santiago del Estero. It is located 32 km from the provincial capital city of Santiago del Estero (capital), south along National Route 9.

Population
Arraga's population, according to the 2001 census, was 903 inhabitants, representing 41% of the Department.

References

Populated places in Santiago del Estero Province